Lublin Voivodeship was a unit of administrative division of the Second Polish Republic between the two world wars, in the years 1919–1939. The province's capital and biggest city was Lublin.

Location and area
The Voivodeship was founded by the decree of Polish Parliament Sejm of 14 August 1919. In the years 1919–1939 (unlike today), Lublin Voivodeship covered the central part of interwar Poland – the heartland of the country – bordering Białystok Voivodeship (1919–39) to the north, Warsaw Voivodeship and Kielce Voivodeship to the west, Lwów Voivodeship to the south and Polesie Voivodeship as well as Volhynian Voivodeship to the east. Its area, after April 1, 1938 (see: Territorial changes of Polish Voivodeships on April 1, 1938) was 26,555 km2. Landscape was flat and hilly in the south, forests covered only 16.6% of the area (with nation's average of 22.2%, as for January 1, 1937).

Demographics
According to the Polish census of 1921 which was the First General Census in the Second Polish Republic following World War I (conducted by the Main Bureau of Statistics, see originals), the population of Lublin Voivodeship could be categorized by both location and religious beliefs in the following way.

Population breakdown by religious denomination in the 1931 national census:

Ethnic groups
According to the 1931 Polish census, the population was 2,116,200. Poles made up 85.1% of population, Jews 10.5%, and Ukrainians (in the east and south) 3%. The Jews preferred to live in the cities and towns, especially in Lublin itself.

Due to ruthless Russification policies throughout the preceding century leading to general absence of schools in the Voivodeship, 24.6% of population was still illiterate as of 1931, although rapidly decreasing from 46.8% in 1921.

Industry
The Voivodeship's biggest industrial center was the city of Lublin. Other than that, it lacked significant industry centers. In mid-1930s Polish government started a huge public works program, called Centralny Okręg Przemysłowy, which was a great boost to overpopulated and poor counties. It covered southwestern part of the Voivodeship, with the town of Kraśnik. The railroad density was 4.0 km. per 100 km2. (with total length of railroads 1 236 km.).

Cities and administrative divisions
Lublin Voivodeship in mid-1939 consisted of 16 powiats (counties) 29 cities and towns and 228 villages. The counties were:
Biała Podlaska county (area 2,122 km2, population 116,000)
Biłgoraj county (area 1,720 km2, population 116,900)
Chełm county (area 1,975 km2, population 162,300)
Hrubieszów county (area 1,575 km2, population 130,000)
Janów Lubelski county (area 1,960 km2, population 152,700)
Krasnystaw county (area 1,521 km2, population 134,200)
Lubartów county (area 1,389 km2, population 108,000)
City of Lublin county (area 30 km2, population 112,300)
Lublin county (area 1,889 km2, population 163,500)
Łuków county (area 1,762 km2, population 129,100)
Puławy county (area 1,618 km2, population 156,500)
Radzyń Podlaski county (area 1,621 km2, population 99,100)
Siedlce county (area 1,988 km2, population 151,400)
Tomaszów Lubelski county (area 1,397 km2, population 121,100)
Włodawa county (area 2,326 km2, population 113,600)
Zamość county (area 1,662 km2, population 149,500)

According to the 1931 census, biggest cities were:
Lublin (pop. 112,300)
Siedlce (pop. 36,900)
Chełm (pop. 29,100)
Zamość (pop. 24,700)
Biała Podlaska (pop. 17,400)
Miedzyrzec Podlaski (pop. 16,800)
Łuków (pop. 14,000)
Hrubieszów (pop. 13,200)
Kraśnik (pop. 12,200)
Puławy (pop. 12,100)

Voivodes
 Stanisław Moskalewski, 17 November 1919 – 25 October 1926
 Antoni Remiszewski, 3 November 1926 – 29 September 1930
 Bolesław Świdziński, 29 September 1930 – 30 January 1933 (acting till 1 April 1932)
 Józef Rożniecki, 31 January 1933 – 8 September 1937
 Jerzy Albin de Tramecourt, 8 September 1937 – 17 September 1939

See also
 Poland's modern-day Lublin Voivodeship

References

 Maly rocznik statystyczny 1939, Nakladem Glownego Urzedu Statystycznego, Warszawa 1939 (Concise Statistical Year-Book of Poland, Warsaw 1939).

 
Former voivodeships of the Second Polish Republic
History of Lublin Voivodeship